Fluviostroma is a fungal genus in the family Trichosphaeriaceae. This is a monotypic genus, containing the single species Fluviostroma wrightii. The genus was circumscribed by G.J. Samuel and E. Mueller in 1980.

References

Trichosphaeriales
Monotypic Sordariomycetes genera